Pumpkin-coconut custard is a Southeast Asian dessert, consisting of a coconut custard steam-baked in a pumpkin or kabocha.

See also
 Coconut jam
 List of custard desserts
 List of squash and pumpkin dishes

Thai desserts and snacks
Cambodian desserts
Laotian desserts
Custard desserts
Foods containing coconut
Squash and pumpkin dishes
Steamed foods